Harry Tunney Waters Jr. (born April 13, 1953) is an American actor, singer and theatre director, best known for his portrayal of Marvin Berry in Back to the Future (1985). His renditions of "Night Train" and "Earth Angel" are two of the ten tracks on the gold record winning soundtrack album Back to the Future: Music from the Motion Picture Soundtrack. 
He created the role of Belize in the first production of Angels in America: A Gay Fantasia on National Themes in 1991.

Career
Born in Tulsa, Oklahoma and growing up in Denver, Colorado, Waters attended Princeton University and received his MFA in Directing from the University of Wisconsin- Madison.  He worked as an actor in New York City on and off Broadway for more than a decade as well as at theaters around the country.  Venues include the Mark Taper Forum, Berkeley Repertory Theatre, TheatreWorks, and the San Jose Repertory Theatre.

He was a member of the Frank Silvera Writers Workshop in Harlem, which has developed the work of new, African American playwrights, directors, designers, and actors since 1973.

In 1985, he was cast as Marvin Berry (a fictional cousin of Chuck Berry) in Back to the Future, a role reprised in Back to the Future Part II in 1989.

In 1991, he created the role of Belize in the first production of Angels in America.

He was a cast member of the 1992 Disney show Adventures in Wonderland portraying Tweedle Dee, based on the Lewis Carroll novels Alice's Adventures in Wonderland and Through the Looking Glass.

He has worked in collaboration with novelist/playwright Jewelle Gomez on a play about James Baldwin, titled Waiting for Giovanni which was produced for the 2011-12 (San Francisco) New Conservatory Theater season.  The project's development was sponsored by Intersection for the Arts.

Waters has taught acting, script development and has directed numerous productions around the country.  He is currently a tenured professor in the Theatre Department at Macalester College. As he approaches retirement, he was appointed as the Associate Dean of the Kofi Annan Institute for Global Citizenship.  Waters is an Honorary Member of Phi Beta Kappa, the nation's most Prestigious Academic Honor Society.

Filmography

References

External links

Selected Works of Harry Waters Jr. bepress.com
Filmography bfi.org.uk

African-American actors
Living people
American male film actors
American male television actors
Princeton University alumni
Macalester College faculty
1953 births
21st-century African-American people
20th-century African-American people